is a Japanese novel by Tamio Kageyama. It won the Naoki Prize in 1988. It was adapted into an anime film named , released in 1993 by Toei Animation. The story revolves around a boy who finds a baby plesiosaur.

Characters
Yusuke is 12-year-old boy.
Coo is a baby plesiosaur.
Tetsuo Obata is a marine biologist
Contseau is a dog.
Catherine "Cathy" Ono is a Japanese-Canadian woman who works for the Coast Guard and "Green Earth".
Col. Nolver is a celebrity among them.
Dr. Davard Duvall is a marine biologist.
Rooslean is a captain of the French navy.

References

External links 
 

1988 Japanese novels
1993 anime films
Drama anime and manga
Films based on Japanese novels
Japanese novels adapted into films
Novels set in Oceania
Plesiosaurs in fiction
Japanese animated films
Toei Animation films